Komazawa Olympic Park (駒沢オリンピック公園) located on land in both Meguro and  Setagaya, Tokyo, Japan, is a sports facility that was constructed for the 1964 Summer Olympics. Approximately 90 per cent of the park's area is in Setagaya Ward, with the remaining 10 per cent sitting within Meguro Ward.

The park includes an outdoor athletic and soccer venue, the Komazawa Olympic Park Stadium, the Komazawa Gymnasium and multiple additional soccer, baseball, swimming, tennis, jogging and cycling facilities.

History
The area was once the "Tokyo Golf Club". Emperor Hirohito played golf there with King George V of the United Kingdom. It was to be developed into the main venue of the 1940 Summer Olympics, which were cancelled due to the Second Sino-Japanese War. In 1953 it became the base of the Toei Flyers baseball team. Redevelopment began from 1962 onwards in preparation for the 1964 Olympics.

References

1964 Summer Olympics official report. Volume 1. Part 1. pp. 124–5.

External links

 

Venues of the 1964 Summer Olympics
Olympic Parks
Parks and gardens in Tokyo
Sports venues in Tokyo
Setagaya
Meguro
1964 establishments in Japan